Lijeva Rijeka is a settlement in the municipality of Podgorica, Montenegro.

It is perhaps best known as the paternal ancestral homeland of Slobodan Milošević.

Demographics
According to the 2011 census, its population was 36.

Notable people
 Gavro Vuković, lawyer and Minister of Foreign Affairs of the Principality of Montenegro
 Savo Orović, colonel of the Royal Yugoslav Army and colonel general of the Yugoslav People's Army

References

Populated places in Podgorica Municipality